Coldstream Packet was launched at Berwick-upon-Tweed in 1794. During the period of the French Revolutionary and Napoleonic Wars she was an armed smack, sailing from Berwick or Leith to other ports in Great Britain. She disappeared in November 1822, believed to have foundered in bad weather.

Career
Although Coldstream Packet was launched in 1794, she first appeared in Lloyd's Register (LR) in 1797.

For about five years (1806–1811), Coldstream Packet sailed for the Union Shipping Company, of Berwick, established in 1794. She may have been sailing for the Company from the start of her career as a book published in 1799 lists her as one of eleven smacks sailing for the Company. The Company apparently first entered into the Leith trade in 1796.

On 30 November 1796 Coldstream Packet, F.Ord, master, was coming into Berwick harbour from Leith when she grounded on Spittle Point. It was expected that she would be gotten off. In the meantime, her crew and passengers were able to get to shore, though with some difficulty.

Fate
Coldstream Packet sailed from Lerwick, Shetland Islands to Leith on 8 November 1822. She was last seen on 10 November and was believed to have foundered off Kinnaird Head, Aberdeenshire. The Register of Shipping for 1823 carried the annotation "LOST" by her name.

Citations

References

1794 ships
Age of Sail merchant ships of England
Packet (sea transport)
Maritime incidents in November 1822
Missing ships
Ships lost with all hands